Matthijs van Heijningen Jr. (born 26 July 1965 in Amsterdam) is a Dutch filmmaker, writer and producer best known for directing The Thing (2011).

Career
Matthijs van Heijningen Jr. began directing at an early age with promotional trailers for Toyota, Peugeot, Renault, Stella Artois, Pepsi, and Bud Light.

In 1996, van Heijningen made his film directing debut with the Dutch short-film thriller Red Rain. In 2011, he directed The Thing, a prequel to John Carpenter's The Thing. Van Heijningen was due to direct Army of the Dead, but the project ended up being directed by Zack Snyder  after lingering in development hell for a number of years.

In 2020, van Heijningen directed his second feature The Forgotten Battle, a Netflix original war film depicting the Battle of the Scheldt. Netflix's first ever original Dutch film.

Filmography 
Director

Producer
 Dada (1994)
 Witness (1994)
 En Route (1994)

Other credits

Personal life
He is the son of Dutch film producer Matthijs van Heijningen Sr.

References

External links

1965 births
Living people
Dutch film producers
Dutch film directors
Dutch screenwriters
Dutch male screenwriters
Writers from Amsterdam